Peruvians in the United Kingdom are Peruvian immigrants to the United Kingdom, who form part of the larger Latin American community in the UK. In 2001, the stock of Peruvian-born immigrants was the sixth largest amongst all Latin American immigrants to the UK.

Demographics

According to the 2001 UK Census, 4,066 Peruvian-born people were living in the UK. As such, Peru was the 107th most common birthplace for UK residents, and sixth out of all Latin American countries, behind Mexico but ahead of Venezuela. This is smaller than such communities in the UK as Brazilians, Colombians and Ecuadorians. The 2011 census recorded 6,659 people born in Peru resident in England, 134 in Wales, 358 in Scotland and 95 in Northern Ireland.

Countries such as the United States and Spain have much larger Peruvian communities than the United Kingdom. Political stability in Peru, unlike for example Colombia and Ecuador, means that the number of Peruvians claiming asylum in the UK is low.

Notable individuals

Notable British people with Peruvian ancestry include actors Michael Bentine and Henry Ian Cusick, who found fame in The Goon Show and Lost respectively.

See also

 Demographics of Peru
 Peruvian American
 Spanish people
 Indigenous peoples of the Americas
 Mestizo
 Hispanic
 British Peruvian
 Paddington Bear

References

 
 
Peruvian
Immigration to the United Kingdom by country of origin
Latin American diaspora in the United Kingdom
Peru–United Kingdom relations